Osoppo is a comune (municipality) in the Province of Udine in the Italian region Friuli-Venezia Giulia, located about  northwest of Trieste and about  northwest of Udine.

Osoppo borders the following municipalities: Buja, Forgaria nel Friuli, Gemona del Friuli, Majano, San Daniele del Friuli, Trasaghis.

Osoppo hosts a large fortress (La Fortezza o Rocca di Osoppo), now an historical attraction.  It played a large role in the defense of Venice against the Austrians in the late 1850s during the time of the Italian Unification of Italy.    It was shortly after one of the main battles at this fortress that Leonardo Andervolti composed his  treatise, Meritorious Champions of Italian Independence, a eulogy to a mythical figure, Enrico Ulissi.

Twin towns
Osoppo is twinned with:

  Rosegg, Austria
  Argelato, Italy

References

External links

 Comune of Osoppo

Cities and towns in Friuli-Venezia Giulia